This is a list of all the yachts built by Oceanco, sorted by year.



Table

Under construction

See also
 List of large sailing yachts
 List of motor yachts by length
 Luxury yacht
 Sailing yacht

References

Oceanco
Built by Oceanco
Built by Oceanco
Oceanco